The 2000–01 CHL season was the ninth season of the Central Hockey League (CHL).

Regular season

Division standings

Note: GP = Games played; W = Wins; L = Losses; SOL = Shootout loss;  Pts = Points; GF = Goals for; GA = Goals against

y - clinched league title; x - clinched playoff spot; e - eliminated from playoff contention

Playoffs

Playoff bracket

CHL awards

External links
 2000–01 CHL season at The Internet Hockey Database

Central Hockey League seasons
2000–01 in American ice hockey by league